Mini is a 2022 Bengali-language drama film directed by Mainak Bhaumik. The film is produced by Rahul Bhanja and Sampurna Lahiri. It was released on 6 May 2022.

Cast

Soundtrack

Release

Theatrical
The trailer of the film was released on 8 April 2022. The film had its theatrical release on 6 May 2022.

Home media
The post-theatrical streaming rights of the film were bought by ZEE5 and the satellite rights of the film was bought by Zee Bangla and Zee Bangla Cinema. It premiered on ZEE5 on December 09, 2022.

Reception 
In The Times Of India, Jaya Biswas rated 3/5 as a positive review stating the film "Mini is a one-time watch keeping in mind the actors’ performances". Cinestaan gave it 2 star out of 5.

References

External links
 
Mini on ZEE5

2022 drama films
2022 films
Bengali-language Indian films